The 2015 World Cup of Pool was the tenth edition of the tournament. The event was held in York Hall, London, England, from September 22 to 27. The 2015 event was sponsored by Dafabet.

Prize fund
Winners (per pair): $60,000
Runners-up (per pair): $30,000
Semi-finalists (per pair): $15,000
Quarter-finalists (per pair): $9,000	
Last 16 losers (per pair): $4,500
Last 32 losers (per pair): $3,625

Participating nations

Seeded teams:
 A (Darren Appleton & Karl Boyes)
 (Carlo Biado & Warren Kiamco)
 (Niels Feijen & Nick van den Berg)
 (Ko Pin-yi & Chang Yu-Lung)
 (Albin Ouschan & Mario He)
 (Shane Van Boening & Mike Dechaine)
 (Nikos Ekonomopoulos & Alexander Kazakis)
 (Li Hewen & Liu Haitao)
 (Ralf Souquet & Thorsten Hohmann)
 (Mika Immonen & Petri Makkonen)
 (Francisco Diaz-Pizarro & Francisco Sanchez Ruiz)
 (Jason Klatt & John Morra)
 (Mateusz Śniegocki & Wojciech Szewczyk)
 (Naoyuki Oi & Toru Kuribayashi)
 B (Mark Gray & Daryl Peach)
 (Jeong Yung Hwa & Ryu Seung Wu)

Unseeded teams:
 (Ibrahim Bin Amir & Kok Jken Yung)
 (Marcus Chamat & Christian Sparrenloev-Fischer)
 (Danieli Corrieri & Antonio Benvenuto)
 (Matt Edwards & Nick Pera)
 (Stephan Cohen & Alex Montpellier)
 (Roman Hybler & Michal Gavenciak)
 (Serge Das & Olivier Mortier)
 (Muhammad Simanjuntak & Irsal Nasution)
 (Babken Melkonyan & Ioan Ladanyi)
 (Aloysius Yapp & Chan Keng Kwang)
 (Waleed Majid & Bashar Hussain)
 (Cristopher Tevez & Manuel Chau)
 (Denis Grabe & Erki Erm)
 (Raj Hundal & Amar Kang)
 (Ruslan Chinakhov & Konstantin Stepanov)
 (Robby Foldvari & Chris Calabrese)

Tournament bracket

References

2015
2015 in cue sports
2015 sports events in London
2015 in English sport
September 2015 sports events in the United Kingdom
International sports competitions in London